3,4-Ethylenedioxythiophene (EDOT) is an organosulfur compound with the formula C2H4O2C4H2S. The molecule consists of thiophene, substituted at the 3 and 4 positions with an ethylene glycolyl unit.  It is a colorless viscous liquid.

EDOT is the precursor to the polymer PEDOT, which is found in electrochromic displays, photovoltaics, electroluminescent displays, printed wiring, and sensors.

Synthesis and polymerization
The original synthesis proceeded via the diester of 3,4-dihydroxythiophene-2,5-dicarboxylate.

EDOT is often prepared from C4 precursors such as butanediol and butadiene via routes that produce the thiophene and dioxane rings in separate steps.  Representative is the reaction of 2,3-butanedione, trimethyl orthoformate, and ethylene glycol to form the dioxane. Sulfidization with elemental sulfur gives the bicyclic target.

EDOT is converted into the conducting polymer PEDOT by oxidation. The mechanism for this conversion begins with production of the radical cation [EDOT]+, which attacks a neutral EDOT molecule followed by deprotonation.  Further similar steps result in the dehydropolymerization.  The idealized conversion using peroxydisulfate is shown
n C2H4O2C4H2S + n (OSO3)22− → [C2H4O2C4S]n + 2n HOSO3−

For commercial purposes, the polymerization is conducted in the presence of polystyrenesulfonate.

References

Thiophenes
Dioxanes
Photovoltaic inverter manufacturers